Invocation is the eighth studio album by the German thrash metal/death metal band Dew-Scented, released in 2010 in Europe by Metal Blade Records and in the United States by Prosthetic Records

Track listing

Reception
{{Album ratings
| title =
| subtitle =
| state =

| MC = 

| 
| rev1 = About Entertainment 
| rev1Score = 
| rev2 = Metal Express Radio
| rev2Score = 
| rev3 = Lords of Metal
| rev3Score = 
| rev4 = Metal Hammer
| rev4Score = (6/7)
| rev5 =
| rev5Score =
| rev6 =
| rev6Score =
| rev7 =
| rev7Score =
| rev8 =
| rev8Score =
| rev9 =
| rev9Score =
| rev10 =
| rev10Score =
| rev11 =
| rev11Score =
| rev12 =
| rev12Score =
}}

Personnel
Alexander Pahl - bass guitar
Leif Jensen - vocals
Michael Borchers - guitar
Martin Walczak - guitar
Marc-Andree Dieken - drums

References

External links

Dew-Scented at Myspace''

2010 albums
Dew-Scented albums
Metal Blade Records albums
Prosthetic Records albums